Craig L. Fox is a broadcasting station owner in New York state in the United States. , he controls five companies which, between them, own 4 AM radio stations, 4 FM radio stations not counting FM translators, and 11 low-power television stations of which 4 are class A television stations.  All of the stations are in New York state.

See also
 List of stations and licensees owned by Craig Fox

References

Living people

Businesspeople from Syracuse, New York

Year of birth missing (living people)